The 28th Legislative Assembly of Quebec / 28th National Assembly of Quebec was the provincial legislature in Quebec, Canada that was elected in the 1966 Quebec general election.  The name change from Legislative Assembly of Quebec to National Assembly of Quebec came into effect on December 31, 1968.  The assembly sat for five sessions, from 1 December 1966 to 12 August 1967; on 20 October 1967 (one day); from 20 February 1968 to 18 December 1968; from 25 February 1969 to 23 December 1969; and from 24 February 1970 to 12 March 1970. The Union Nationale government was led by Daniel Johnson until his death in office, and then by Jean-Jacques Bertrand. The Liberal opposition was led by Jean Lesage and then by Robert Bourassa.

Seats per political party

 After the 1966 elections

Member list

This was the list of members of the National Assembly of Quebec that were elected in the 1966 election:

Other elected MNAs

Other MNAs were elected in by-elections during this mandate

 Jean-Guy Cardinal, Union Nationale, Bagot, December 4, 1968 
 William Tetley, Quebec Liberal Party, Notre-Dame-de-Grâce, December 4, 1968 
 Mario Beaulieu, Union Nationale, Dorion, March 3, 1969 
 Gilles Gauthier, Union Nationale, Trois-Rivières, October 8, 1969 
 François-Édouard Belliveau, Union Nationale, Vaudreuil-Soulanges, October 8, 1969,
 Jean-Jacques Croteau, Union Nationale, Sainte-Marie, October 8, 1969 
 Jean Cournoyer, Union Nationale, Saint-Jacques, October 8, 1969

Cabinet Minister

Johnson Sr. Cabinet (1966-1968)

 Prime Minister and Executive Council President: Daniel Johnson Sr.
 Vice-President of the Executive Council: Jean-Jacques Bertrand
 Agriculture and Colonization: Clement Vincent
 Labour: Maurice Bellemare
 Public Works: Fernand-Joseph Lafontaine (1966–1967), Armand Russell (1967–1968)
 Cultural Affairs: Jean-Noël Tremblay
 Health, Family and Social Welfare: Jean-Paul Cloutier
 Education: Jean-Jacques Bertrand (1966–1967), Jean-Guy Cardinal (1967–1968)
 Lands and Forests: Claude-Gilles Gosselin
 Tourism, Hunting and Fishing: Gabriel Loubier
 Natural Resources: Daniel Johnson Sr. (1966–1967), Paul-Emile Allard (1967–1968)
 Roads: Fernand-Joseph Lafontaine
 Transportation and Communications: Fernand Lizotte
 Municipal Affairs: Paul Dozois (1966–1967), Robert Lussier (1967–1968)
 Federal-provincial Affairs: Daniel Johnson Sr. (1966–1967)
 Intergovernmental Affairs: Daniel Johnson Sr. (1967–1968)
 Industry and Commerce:Maurice Bellemare (1966–1967), Jean-Paul Beaudry (1967–1968)
 Financial Institutions, Companies and Cooperatives: Paul Dozois (1968)
 Justice: Jean-Jacques Bertrand
 Provincial Secretary: Yves Gabias
 Finances: Paul Dozois
 Revenue: Raymond Thomas Johnston
 State Ministers: Francis Boudreau, Marcel Masse, Roch Boivin, Armand Russell (1966–1967), Edgar Charbonneau, Armand Maltais, Francois-Eugene Mathieu, Paul-Emile Allard (1966–1967), Jean-Marie Morin (1968)

Bertrand Cabinet (1968-1970)

 Prime Minister and Executive Council President: Jean-Jacques Bertrand
 Vice-President of the Executive Council: Jean-Guy Cardinal
 Agriculture and Colonization: Clément Vincent
 Labour: Maurice Bellemare (1968)
 Labour and Workforce: Maurice Bellemare (1968–1970), Jean Cournoyer (1970)
 Public Works: Armand Russell
 Public Office: Jean Cournoyer (1969–1970)
 Cultural Affairs: Jean-Noël Tremblay
 Immigration: Yves Gabias (1968–1969), Mario Beaulieu (1969–1970)
 Health, Family and Social Welfare: Jean-Paul Cloutier
 Education: Jean-Guy Cardinal
 Lands and Forests: Claude-Gilles Gosselin
 Tourism, Hunting and Fishing: Gabriel Loubier
 Natural Resources: Paul-Émile Allard
 Roads: Fernand-Joseph Lafontaine
 Transportation and Communications: Fernand Lizotte (1968–1970)
 Transportation: Fernand Lizotte (1970)
 Communications: Gérard Lebel (1970)
 Municipal Affairs: Robert Lussier
 Intergovernmental Affairs: Jean-Jacques Bertrand (1968–1969), Marcel Masse (1969–1970)
 Industry and Commerce:Jean-Paul Beaudry
 Financial Institutions, Companies and Cooperatives: Paul Dozois (1968), Yves Gabias (1968–1969), Mario Beaulieu (1969), Armand Maltais (1969–1970)
 Justice: Jean-Jacques Bertrand (1968–1969), Rémi Paul (1969–1970)
 Provincial Secretary: Yves Gabias (1968), Rémi Paul (1968–1970)
 Finances: Paul Dozois (1968–1969), Jean-Jacques Bertrand (1969), Mario Beaulieu (1969–1970)
 Revenu: Raymond Thomas Johnston
 State Ministers: Roch Boivin, Jean-Marie Morin, Francois-Eugène Mathieu, Francis Boudreau, Marcel Masse (1968), François Gagnon (1969–1970), Edgar Charbonneau

Diagram

References
 1966 election results
 List of historical Cabinet Ministers

Notes

28